Novozadonsky is a rural locality (a khutor) in Bodeyevskoye Rural Settlement, Liskinsky District, Voronezh Oblast, Russia. The population was 205 as of 2010. There are 3 streets.

Geography 
Novozadonsky is located 31 km northwest of Liski (the district's administrative centre) by road. Bodeyevka is the nearest rural locality.

References 

Rural localities in Liskinsky District